Kyriaki Vasiliou (born 17 June 1997) is a Cypriot footballer who plays as a midfielder for First Division club Lakatamia FC and the Cyprus women's national team.

International career
Vasiliou capped for Cyprus at senior level on 27 February 2019 playing the first half of a 2–1 friendly win against Lithuania.

References

1997 births
Living people
Cypriot women's footballers
Cyprus women's international footballers
Women's association football midfielders